Selviytyjät Suomi is a Finnish reality show based on Survivor. It premiered on MTV3 on 21 February 2013.

The first season was filmed from May 2012 to July 2012 in Malaysia. 16 contestants participated in the competition. The winner of the show received 50,000 euros on the first season and 30,000 euros in the later seasons. The first season is hosted by Heikki Paasonen and onwards second season Juuso Mäkilähde. Winner of the first season was Jarkko Kortesoja. After the first season ended, MTV3 did not renew the series for a second season. In 2017, Nelonen got the rights to the series and decided to make a Celebrity season, airing the following year. This is the first season of Survivor to air on Nelonen since 2005 when the last season of Suomen Robinson aired on the network. Currently there has been aired 4 seasons in channel Nelonen, and the fifth is under production.

The version uses slightly similar rules compared for the original version, but there's less contestants. And no live-end. However, the seasons aired on Nelonen, include a show called Selviytyjät Extra, where in each episode, the cast do collect the challenges, results and elimination of the previous episode.

Season overview

Selviytyjät Suomi 2013

Selviytyjät Suomi 2019

Challenges

Voting history

Kim wins the last immunity and he decided to eliminated vote's Virpi in the final TC

References

Finland
2013 Finnish television series debuts
2010s Finnish television series
MTV3 original programming
Nelonen original programming